Mimurogawa Dam is a dam in the Okayama Prefecture, Japan, completed in 2005.

References 

Dams in Okayama Prefecture
Dams completed in 2005